Old Man Winter is a personification of winter.  The name is a colloquialism for the winter season derived from ancient Greek mythology and Old World pagan beliefs evolving into modern characters in both literature and popular culture. He is usually depicted as an old man, most commonly blowing winter over the landscape with his breath, or simply freezing the landscape with his very presence.

History
Humans have associated the winter season with deities since the ancient Greek god of winter Boreas, the Norse god of winter Ullr and continuing on in other cultures including Celtic mythology with the goddess Cailleach and goddess Beira. Over time, the old gods of winter changed to new humanizations of the seasons, including Old Man Winter. However, some cultures had a character clearly named "Old Man Winter", where the name was not a shorthand for some other god or spirit. Among the Potawatomi people of the Western Great Lakes region, there exists a myth about Old Man Winter, called Pondese in their language. Old Man Winter was a character in Iroquois legends.

Popular culture
There are countless references to this personification of winter throughout literature, music, games, cultural events and even in advertising.

Literature
 Nancy Wood, an American author and poet, included a poem titled "Old Man Winter" in her 1974 collection of poetry and prose called Many Winters
 Mabel Powers, an American author, suffragist and feminist, known for collecting and disseminating Native American folklore, included a story titled "How Old Man Winter Was Driven Back" in an anthology of Iroquois stories. 
 J. Walter Brain, penned a poem entitled "Old Man Winter".

Advertising
 American Airlines used Old Man Winter in a 1941 ad campaign, touting "Old Man Winter... We like his snow to play in, but it's not all fun... travel above those dark, low-hanging clouds..."
 The Libbey-Owens-Ford Glass Company used Old Man Winter in a World War 2 era ad campaign promoting their new storm windows. The campaign was launched in conjunction with the US Government in an effort to keep domestic fuel consumption low and conserve it for the war effort. "Keep Old Man Winter Out... Keep Warm With Storm Windows!" the ads read.

Sports and games
 The Old Man Winter Bike Rally and Run is held in February every year in Lyons, Colorado.
 A thoroughbred race horse, born in 2017 and owned by James S. Acquilano, was named Old Man Winter.

Music
 There is a two part choral octavo called Old Man Winter, written by Lois Brownsey and Marti Lunn Lantz.

Food and drink
 Ribstone Creek Brewery, located in Edgerton, Alberta, Canada, brews a porter by the name of Old Man Winter. This beer won a silver medal in the porter category in the 2020 Canadian Brewing Awards.
 Southern Tier Brewing Company, which originated in Lakewood, New York, USA and now has locations in Pennsylvania, North Carolina and Ohio, brews an ale called Old Man Winter. 
 Cape Cod Beer, located in Hyannis, Massachusetts, brews an old ale by the name of Old Man Winter.

See also

 Deities and personifications of winter
 Ded Moroz, Russian name for "Old Man Frost"
 Jack Frost, personification of frost, ice, snow, sleet, winter and freezing cold
 Yuki-onna, a "snow woman" spirit in Japanese folklore

References

External links

Personifications of weather
Winter in culture
Winter traditions
Jack Frost